Patna Ghat railway station was
 a small railway station in Patna district, Bihar. Its code is PTG. It serves Patna city. The station consists of a single platform.

References

External links 

 Official website of the Patna district

Railway stations in Patna
Railway stations in Patna district
Danapur railway division